was a private junior college in the city of Tōkai in Aichi Prefecture, Japan.

History 
Nagoya Meitoku Junior College opened in 1989. It closed in 2003.

Courses offered 
 English studies
 International culture

See also 
 List of junior colleges in Japan

References 

Educational institutions established in 1989
Japanese junior colleges
1989 establishments in Japan
Universities and colleges in Aichi Prefecture
Private universities and colleges in Japan
2003 disestablishments in Japan
Educational institutions disestablished in 2003